Aija Putniņa (born 15 January 1988) is a Latvian women's basketball player with the Latvia women's national basketball team. She competed with the team at the 2008 Summer Olympics, where she scored 2 points in 3 games.

Professional career
On 5 August 2022, she signed with Galatasaray of the Turkish Women's Basketball Super League (TKBL).

References

External links

Colorado profile

1988 births
Living people
Basketball players at the 2008 Summer Olympics
Colorado Buffaloes women's basketball players
Latvian expatriate basketball people in France
Latvian expatriate basketball people in Hungary
Latvian expatriate basketball people in Italy
Latvian expatriate basketball people in Lithuania
Latvian expatriate basketball people in Spain
Latvian expatriate basketball people in Turkey
Latvian expatriate basketball people in the United States
Latvian women's basketball players
Olympic basketball players of Latvia
Power forwards (basketball)
Basketball players from Riga
Galatasaray S.K. (women's basketball) players
Botaş SK players